Robert Julius Trumpler (until 1915 Robert Trümpler, born October 2, 1886 in Zürich, Switzerland; died September 10, 1956 in Berkeley, United States) was a Swiss-American astronomer.

Career
After initial schooling, Trumpler entered the Universität Zürich but later transferred to the University of Göttingen where he earned his PhD in 1910. In 1915, during World War I, he emigrated to the United States and joined the University of California. He took a position at Allegheny Observatory, and later went to Lick Observatory. In 1921, he became a naturalized citizen of the United States. He was elected a member of the United States National Academy of Sciences in 1932.

He is most noted for observing that the brightness of the more distant open clusters was lower than expected, and the stars appeared more red. This was explained by the interstellar dust scattered through the galaxy, resulting in the absorption (extinction) of light or interstellar extinction of light.

Trumpler further studied and catalogued open clusters in order to determine the size of the Milky Way galaxy. At first he thought his analysis placed an upper limit on the Milky Way's diameter of about 10,000 parsecs with the Sun located somewhat near the center although he later revised this. While cataloguing open clusters, he also devised a system for their classification according to the number of stars observed within them, how concentrated these stars are in the center of the cluster and the range of their apparent brightness. This system, known as the Trumpler classification, is still in use today.

Honors
The Robert J. Trumpler Award, awarded by the Astronomical Society of the Pacific for an outstanding PhD Thesis in astronomy, is named in his honor.

The following celestial features are named after him:
 The crater Trumpler on the Moon.
 Trumpler Crater on Mars.
 Trumpler classification, the classification scheme for open clusters.
 Trumpler catalogue, the catalogue of open clusters that he compiled.

Notable objects

Some notable objects from his 1930 catalogue of open clusters are:
 Trumpler 2
 Trumpler 14
 Trumpler 15
 Trumpler 16
 Trumpler 27

Selected publications
 R.J. Trumpler, 1930. "Preliminary results on the distances, dimensions and space distribution of open star clusters." Lick Obs. Bull. Vol XIV, No. 420 (1930) 154-188. Table 16 is the Trumpler catalog of open clusters, referred to as "Trumpler (or Tr) 1-37
 Robert Julius Trumpler, Harold F. Weaver 1962. Statistical Astronomy (Dover Publications, New York).  (reprinted from original published by the University of California, Berkeley, 1953)

See also
List of astronomical catalogues
Melotte catalogue - a similar catalogue of star clusters published by Philibert Jacques Melotte in 1915.
Collinder catalogue - a similar catalogue of open star clusters published by Per Collinder in 1931, one year after Trumpler.

References

 National Academy of Sciences biography - Biographical Memoirs V.78 (2000) pp. 276–297
 The Munich Astro Archive – Robert Julius Trumpler (October 2, 1886 - September 10, 1956)
 The Interstellar Medium: Dust

Further reading
 
 Winkler, Kurt, "Robert Julius Trumpler and the Cosmos: The Contributions of a Swiss American Astronomer," Swiss American Historical Society Review, vol. 49, no. 2 (2013), p. 1-9.

1886 births
1956 deaths
20th-century American astronomers
Swiss emigrants to the United States
University of California, Berkeley faculty
20th-century Swiss astronomers
Members of the United States National Academy of Sciences